John Dowling may refer to:

Sports
John Dowling (Australian rules footballer) (1909–1967), Australian rules footballer for North Melbourne and Footscray
John Dowling (footballer, born 1944), Australian rules footballer for St Kilda
John Dowling (Gaelic footballer) (1930–1998), Irish Gaelic footballer
John Dowling (rugby league) (born 1953), Australian former rugby league footballer
John Dowling (sports administrator) (1931–2002), Irish Gaelic games administrator

Other people
John Dowling (musician) (born 1981), British banjo player
John Dowling (pastor) (1807–1878), American pastor and author
John Dowling (RAF officer) (1923–2000), British helicopter pilot
John Francis Dowling (1851–1926), Ontario physician and political figure
John E. Dowling (born before 1961), American neuroscientist
John Dowling, deputy Supreme Knight of the Knights of Columbus
John Dowling, professor at Ecole de Management Léonard De Vinci

See also
John Dowling Coates, Australian businessman and Olympic committee member
Jonathan Dowling (1955–2020), physicist